Lookism is a South Korean webtoon written and illustrated by Park Tae-joon. The webtoon was first published weekly on Naver Webtoon in November 2014. Its story revolves around a high-school student who can switch between two bodies: one fat and ugly, and the other fit and handsome. A Korean animated series adaptation by Studio Mir was released globally on Netflix in December 2022.

Plot
Park Hyung Seok is an unpopular and bullied high-school student who is looked down on by his fellow student for his obesity. Bullied and harassed every day by a delinquent, he takes out his anger verbally on his mother and asks for a school transfer. Resolving to run away from his problems and start anew, he moves to Seoul and plans to attend a new high school. A few nights before he begins school, however, he receives a new body that is tall, muscular, and handsome. When one body is in use, the other falls asleep; he can switch bodies by waking up the sleeping one.

His days are split between the two bodies: the handsome one for the daytime, and the original for the night. As Daniel Park (Park Hyung Seok) lives with two bodies, he begins to see how much the world discriminates against people considered unattractive or different. He experiences discrimination and hate for his original body, kindness, and special treatment of others. His new body makes him a social-media influencer, a trainee for an entertainment company, and a clothing model. At night, however, Daniel's dream life becomes a harsh reality when he returns to his original body.

Characters

Main
Daniel Park/Park Hyung Suk/Keisuke Hasegawa

Daniel Park is a naïve high-school student who is bullied by Logan Lee. Before transferring to Jae Won High School to escape the bullying, he awakens with a slimmer, more-attractive body next to his chubby one. With his new body, he makes friends and learns about the world and himself from a new perspective. 
Vasco/Lee Eun Tae/Basco

Vasco has a reputation of being a Robin Hood-like figure, defending the weak and bullied. A childhood friend of Jace Park, he leads Burn Knucklesa gang which punishes bullies and other wrongdoers. Despite his tough exterior, he is sweet and seeks the friendship of those he considers good.

Jay Hong/Hong Jae Yeol
A quiet, wealthy, and mysterious character who uses the systema and kali martial arts.

Zack Lee/Lee Jin Sung/Ryūsei Kitahara

Zack Lee is a boxer who was aggressive towards everyone except his childhood friend, Mira Kim, whom he loves. Mira dislikes violence, so Zack stops bullying and becomes more patient. They are friends with Johan Seong.

Mira Kim/Kim Mi Jin/Mizuki Sakane

Mira Kim is compassionate, patient, and observant, and sees the good in everyone. Johan Seong and Zack Lee were in love with her. 
Zoe Park/Park Ha Neul/Kagawa Mirei

Zoe Park is a beautiful girl who tried to use charm to get what she wanted. After Daniel's original body saves her from a stalker, however, she develops feelings for him.
Crystal Choi/Choi Soo Jung/Akari Nerima

Crystal Choi, daughter of the HNH company chairman, also has two bodies. First, an overweight student who transfers to the fashion department of Daniel's school, she lives in her original body during the day. Her different treatment leads her to believe that the world judges those with a different appearance unkindly. Crystal sees the handsome Daniel as an egotistical bully (based on his looks) and prefers the other Daniel's personality.

Supporting
Daniel's mother/Mrs. Kim Park
Daniel's single mother is an old, hardworking, and patient woman. After seeing Logan bully Daniel, and Daniel yelling at her, she transfers him to Jae Won High School. She works twice as hard to enable Daniel to attend J High, folding and selling empty boxes and working part-time waiting tables. More than anything, she wants Daniel to be happy. As he matures, Daniel begins to appreciate and help his mother.
Jace Park/Park Bum Jae
Jace, the second-in-command of the Burn Knuckles, is a childhood friend of Vasco and helped Vasco overcome his fear of needles.
Duke Pyeon/Pyeon Deok Hwa/Hinto Kon

A short, plump student and an aspiring rapper who was bullied by others and rejected by producers. When he meets and collaborates with Daniel, he gains confidence, begins streaming on TV and becomes famous. In the middle of the webtoon, he became a famous rapper.
Jiho Park/Park Ji Ho
Bullied at J High until Daniel takes him under his wing, he is obsessed with power and societal standards. Jiho shows signs of an inferiority complex and goes to juvenile prison for the attempted murders of Daniel Park and James Gong. He becomes mentally ill in prison and is influenced by Jake Kim. He commits suicide after a fight with Daniel, while being haunted by his hallucinations.
Logan Lee/Lee Tae Sung
A big, strong character who bullied Daniel Park in his former school; after Daniel moved to Seoul, Logan did too. Daniel stands up to Logan in his original body, and they reach an uneasy truce. Logan is expelled after assaulting his advisor.
Vin Jin/Jin Ho Bin/Takahito Saitama

Arrogant, he says he is better than everyone else and dislikes Daniel and Duke. He fears losing his sunglasses, and loses control when they are removed; this is later explained by his polycoria in one eye.
Mary Kim
A pretty, blonde girl who is friends with Vin Jin and is known in Cheonliang (her and Vin Jin's hometown) as the Empress of Two Seconds because she defeats opponents in a fight in two seconds. She hides her past as overweight but skilled in Judo and receiving plastic surgery.
Yui Kim
The leading streamer on Paprika TV until Zoe joins the website. When her boyfriend learns from Zack that she flirted with Daniel, he beats her until Zack stops him. She then develops feelings for Zack.
Doo Lee/Lee Hyun Do
Jiho's main tormentor, he stays around Zack and Daniel mostly to increase his popularity but helps them as needed. A streamer on Paprika TV, Tae Joon collaborates with him to taunt Shin Dae Hoon; they are caught by his gang before being bailed out by Vasco, Zack, and Daniel. He later sometimes appears as Daniel destroys the Workers, once as part of Alexander's clean-up crew, then became Hannya of Mitsuki's crew.
Tae Joon Park
An Executive Manager of PTJ Entertainment who will do almost anything for fame.
Leonn Lee
A mysterious freshman who is revealed to be a girl, her character is a tsundere.
Joy Hong/Hong Jae Hye
Jay's little sister and a model who has a crush on handsome Daniel and enrolls in J High to see him more often.
Nam Su Lee
A nerdy classmate tasked by Zack to buy shoes for him. He buys a ring and says that Daniel is poor and has no fashion sense, and Jay gives Daniel a collection of expensive clothes.
David, Dylan and Sarah Park
Daniel's cousins. Dylan wants to be a rapper, and is Duke's fan; David, a college student, is the star of the Park family, being enrolled into a prestigious university; Sarah, Dylan's sister, has a crush on handsome Daniel.
Hong Ki Tae
Jay's older brother. The polar opposite of Jay.
Samuel Seo
An executive, working for the workers. Previously from Big Deal and was known as Big Deal No.3. He was initially on Alexander's side, then takes over the affiliates that has fallen. Initially allied with Eugene, but turned after a deal with Johan. His goal is to become "King" and will do whatever it takes to do so.
Alexander Hwang
Samuel's associate, who disappears.
Like What and So Funny
Runaway girls who are first forced into prostitution and then begin streaming to earn money. Currently under Sally Park's care.
Warren Chae
Speaks in broken sentences before joining Daniel in his mission. He regains his speech later on and joins Eli in his endeavors.
Eli Jang/Jang Hyun
The single father of a baby girl named Yenna, the daughter of his teenage sweetheart Heather. Jong Gun had his eyes on him for his fighting prowess but also because Eli created the original Hostel. Currently under Eugene's control.
Sally Park
Usually seen with Warren Chae, she is an orphan who lives in an abandoned building inherited from her grandmother in the US.
Max Kang and Derek Jo
Tteokbokki sellers and club promoters. The power duo of Hostel.
Olly Wang
Heather's friend and schoolmate. Betrayed Hostel after he wasn't included, which nearly destroyed the fam. He created his own Hostel from scratch. Commits suicide after learning the source of his inability to feel pain, his guilt over Heather's tragic end. 
James Gong
Jiho's psychotic, sadistic bully. Resurfaced after escaping the hospital he was, joining initially Olly's Hostel, then left with Jasmine and Olly's orphans aboard a coaster.
Jasmine Huh
Daniel's classmate, who is a pathological liar. She lives with James and the child soldiers trained by Olly trained, riding a stolen bus.
Johan Seong
Zack and Mira's childhood friend. Bullied because he was poor and his mother was going blind, he had a crush on Mira. His mother's mental state deteriorates and a local religious figure persuades her to join the God Dog cult. Johan takes over the cult, taking its mascot as his own. He aids Jace in Cheonliang and fights with Jin before joining the White Tiger Job Center under Tom Lee. Left the group and becomes allied with Charles Choi, but his sight was still worsening. He picked up other martial arts as his arsenal.
Jong Gun/Jang Dong Gun
Crystal Choi's sadomasochistic gangster bodyguard, who is an extortionist. Once a Yakiza member, he destroyed the clan after he got bored, and became Charles's money collector.
Joon Goo/Goo Kim
A fighter who frequents juvenile centers and succeeds Jong Gun in his extortion racket after Gun loses interest in it. Initially appears as a paid merc by his own cousin.
Jake Kim
Leader of a Seoul's Big Deal gang and a good fighter, he was placed in juvenile prison for an illegal betting ring and became influenced by Jiho. He reforms his gang and is always at odds with Daniel. Now, he was at odds with Eugene and his old colleague.
Jerry Kwon
Jake Kim's number-two, known as Jake Kim's Sword, who cares for the cat Leon. Usually gentle, except when following Jake's orders.
Jin Jang
Johan's faithless lieutenant, who begins spying on J High and plots to pit the students against each other. He later revives his K House gang from the God Dog ruins.
Kouji/Ko Woo Ji
A hacker, he dupes the illegal toto operators and hacks the security feed of the store at which Daniel works. He wants to hack onto Jay's systems.
Charles Choi/Elite
Crystal's father, an executive who worked at a convenience store until he created 4 crews with Jong Gun and other geniuses. He raised 10 geniuses (Group of 10 people who are extremely capable in their respective fields, DG and Kouji among them).
Steve Hong
Ki Tae, Joy and Jay's father, an executive who knows Charles Choi. He becomes Daniel's secret ally to take down the four gangs.
DG/Diego Kang/James Lee
World famous K-pop star who has some hidden past identity, the original James Lee. One of Charles Choi's associates, who seems to know about Daniel's ability and is modeled on G-Dragon. He is most probably the strongest character in the verse.
Oliver Jang/Jang Udon/Woo Dong Jang
Debuts in a new group, Inspirit. Was once in relationship with ARU, until she betrayed him. Became a perpetual trainee until Daniel and Joy joins the crew.
La Sol/Ra Sol
Another perpetual trainee alongside Oliver who becomes a trainer. ARU's friend, was reduced to her status after ARU rose above the rank.
ARU
Oliver's ex-girlfriend and a star who is caught in a casting couch situation.
Tom Lee
One of Charles Choi's 10 Geniuses and owner of a private security agency, White Tiger. Prefers fighting on boxer shorts.
Justine Peng and Chuck Kwak
Two illegal Chinese immigrants rejected by Jake Kim but later accepted by Olly Wang.
Vivi
Chinese woman who flees to Korea to escape her Chinese drug cases, the head of a powerful family who built a club and hotel to cover her drug addiction. She later returns to China with Xiaolung.
Xiaolung
Vivi's servant, who becomes a eunuch to remain close to her. He returns to Korea after taking Vivi home and joins Eugene.
Alexander Kwang
Covers up his rackets by imprisoning promising vloggers and forcing them to work for him, but is foiled by Daniel. Disappeared afterward, last seen as part of a clean-up crew.
Sofia
A muscular Russian woman, Steve Hong's bodyguard, who trains Daniel to reduce his weight.
Eugene
Head of the gang for which Samuel works, who issues deceptive invitations in Olly Wang's name. He invites the other gangs to unite against Charles Choi; Jake, Justin and Chuck accept, and Johan and Eli decline. He Apprentices Daniel, but does not trust him. He has a twin brother named Yuseong, who was the mysterious silent capped character with black VVIP badge.
Yuseong
Eugene's twin brother, a silent but emotionally unstable person.
Hudson Kim, Jacky Lee and Channing Choi
Leaders of the Ansan Public, a group trying to establish a footing in Seoul. Join Jiho and Darius Hong to form the James Lee Crew, and return to Ansan after being beaten by Daniel, Zack and Vasco. Hudson is their leader, Jacky is the most agile, and Channing is a sadist.
Mitsuki/Neko
Leader of the 2nd affiliate and emcee of the underground death-match club, who has feelings for Sinu.
Ryūhei/Nōmen
Acquaintance of Mitsuki who wears a Nōmen mask. His name was Ryūhei.
Hyottoko and Daruma
Two masked men; Hyottoko is a sumo wrestler and discharged JSDF soldier named Kazuma Sato, and Daruma is a former Yakuza named Kenta Magami, who had grudge against Jong-gun for destroying his clan.

Themes
The webtoon's main theme is lookism: bias based on a person's physical appearance. Daniel, the main character, is an overweight, unattractive student who is bullied until his appearance changes. Other themes include gangs, extortion, animal hoarding, cults, body shaming, anti-social behaviours, stalking, body positivity, rape, and attempted murder.

Character designs
Daniel's design was inspired by model Park Hyung-seok. Jay Hong's design was inspired by model Hong Jae-yeol; DG was inspired by G-Dragon; Oliver Jang's design was inspired by Jang Dongwoo, ARU by singer IU, Jace is modeled by former 2PM leader and singer Jay Park. and Vasco/Euntae Lee was inspired by a rapper whose former stage name was Vasco. The manhwa was created by Park Tae-joon, also a model.

Adaptations

Chinese television series
Tencent produced 外貌至上主义 (Wàimào Zhìshàng Zhǔyì), a 38-episode Chinese television series based on Lookism, in 2019. The Chinese series starred Lomon, Wayne Zhang, Wang Zi Xuan and Dino Lee.

Korean animated series
A Korean animated series adaptation by Studio Mir titled 외모지상주의 /  was announced during Netflix's "Tudum" virtual event on September 25, 2022. The series is directed by Kwang Il Han, with Dae Woo Lee doing art and Kyung-Hoon Han composing the music. It was originally set to be released worldwide on Netflix on November 4, 2022, but was delayed to December 8, due to the Seoul Halloween crowd crush. Ateez performed the series' theme song "Like That".

References

External links
 English edition of Lookism
 Korean edition of Lookism

Books about bias
Bullying in fiction
Korean animation
Korean-language Netflix original programming
Manhwa adapted into television series
Manhwa titles
Naver Comics titles
Netflix original anime
School webtoons
South Korean animated television series
South Korean web series
South Korean webtoons
Television series by Studio Mir